The Conspiracy of the Slaves ( or ) was a failed plot by Muslim slaves in Hospitaller-ruled Malta to rebel, assassinate Grand Master Manuel Pinto da Fonseca and take over the island. The revolt was to have taken place on 29 June 1749, but plans were leaked to the order before it began; the plotters were arrested and most were later executed.

Background

In the mid-18th century, Hospitaller-ruled Malta enslaved around 9,000 Muslims. They were given freedom of religion, being allowed to gather for prayers. Although laws prevented them from interacting with the Maltese people, these were not regularly enforced. Some slaves also worked as merchants and at times were allowed to sell their wares in the streets and squares of Valletta.

In February 1748, Hungarian, Georgian and Maltese slaves on board the Ottoman ship Lupa revolted, taking over 150 Ottomans prisoner, including Mustafa, the Pasha (i.e. 'lord' or 'governor') of Rhodes. They sailed the captured ship to Malta and the prisoners were enslaved. Mustafa was placed under house arrest on the insistence of France due to the Franco-Ottoman alliance and was eventually freed. He converted to Christianity and married a Maltese woman, so he was allowed to remain in Malta.

Plot

Mustafa planned to organize a slave revolt on 29 June 1749. The day was the feast of Saints Peter and Paul, and a banquet was to be celebrated at the Grandmaster's Palace in Valletta. Slaves were to poison the food at the banquet as well as within the auberges and other palaces. After the banquet, a small group of slaves would assassinate Grand Master Manuel Pinto da Fonseca in his sleep, while 100 palace slaves would overpower the guards. They would then attack the Slaves' Prison to free the remaining Muslims, while others were to attack Fort Saint Elmo and take weapons from the armouries. The Ottoman Beys of Tunis, Tripoli and Algiers were to send a fleet which was to invade Malta upon receiving a signal from the rebels.

Discovery and aftermath
The plot was discovered on 6 June, three weeks before it was to take place. Three slaves had met in a coffee shop in Strada della Fontana (now St Christopher Street), Valletta, near the Slaves' Prison, to win the support of a Maltese guard to the Grand Master, and began to quarrel. The shop owner, a neophyte called Giuseppe Cohen, overheard them mention the revolt and reported this information to the Grand Master. The three slaves were arrested, and they revealed details of the plan after being tortured.

The leaders were subsequently arrested, and 38 of them were tried and executed. Some plotters converted and asked to be baptized just before being killed. One hundred twenty-five others were hanged in Palace Square in Valletta, while eight were branded with the letter R (for ) on their forehead, and were condemned to the galleys for life. On the insistence of France, Mustafa Pasha, who was behind the revolt, was not executed but was taken back to Rhodes on a French vessel.

Consequences

Following the foiling of the plot, Grand Master Pinto reported the events to his ambassadors in Europe. Laws restricting the movement of slaves were made stricter. They could not go outside the city limits, and were not to approach any fortifications. They were not allowed to gather anywhere except from their mosque, and were to sleep only in the Slaves' Prison. They could not carry any weapons or keys to government buildings.

Cohen, who had revealed the plan, was given an annual pension of 300 scudi from the order's treasury and another 200 scudi from the Università of Valletta. Cohen was also given a house in Valletta, which had previously been the seat of the università until it moved to new premises in 1721. The house remained in the Cohen family until 1773, when they were given an annuity and the building was taken over to house the Monte di Pietà.

In literature
The poem  ("I am talking about you, Malta"), an early example of Maltese literature, was written by an anonymous author some years after the attempted revolt.

In 1751, Giovanni Pietro Francesco Agius de Soldanis published  about the conspiracy. He published it under the pseudonym Michele Acciard, an Italian who de Soldanis had met in his travels (although some documents suggest that Acciard was actually involved in its writing as well). The book caused considerable controversy since it attacked the order and argued for the rights of the Maltese. This resulted in it being banned in Malta, and de Soldanis had to go to Rome to defend himself in front of Pope Benedict XIV. He returned in 1752 and was forgiven by Pinto.

In 1779, Pietro Andolfati wrote a play about the revolt, entitled La congiura di Mustafa Bassa di Rodi contro i cavalieri Maltesi: ovvero le glorie di Malta (The conspiracy of Mustapha Pasha of Rhodes against the knights of Malta, or the glories of Malta).

References

Further reading
 Historic details. 
 

Rebellions in Malta
18th century in Valletta
Conflicts in 1749
18th-century rebellions
Conspiracies
Failed assassination attempts in Europe
1749 in Malta
Islam in Malta
Slavery in Malta
18th-century coups d'état and coup attempts
Slave rebellions in Europe